Reeve's moray (Gymnothorax reevesii) is a moray eel of the family Muraenidae. Its length is up to 60 cm.

References

 
 

reevesii
Fish described in 1845